Niedner is a surname. Notable people with the surname include:

 Adolph Otto Niedner (1863–1954), American gunsmith
 Christian Wilhelm Niedner (1797–1865), German historian and theologian 
 Gereon Niedner-Schatteburg (born 1959), German physicist and chemist